The Ministry of Infrastructure and Development was a ministerial department of the government of Poland. The ministry was created in November 2013 following the merger of the Ministry of Regional Development and the Ministry of Transport, Construction and Marine Economy during the cabinet of Prime Minister Donald Tusk. The last minister responsible for the department was Andrzej Adamczyk. It was split in late 2015 into Ministry of Energy, Ministry of Infrastructure and Construction and Ministry of Development.

Functions
The Ministry of Infrastructure and Development was tasked as the main coordinator for a variety of economic and infrastructural development roles. This included Poland's national and regional development policy, managing and distributing European Union structural and cohesion funds, eliminating spatial economic disparities, and promoting social and economic cohesion among the public and the private sector. The ministry was also tasked for managing the republic's transportation infrastructure, including motorways and expressways, national roads, the rail network, airports, and the nation's maritime transport sector. Additionally, the ministry also included housing and construction policy within its scope.

Ministers of Infrastructure and Development

References

External links
  Official website

Poland, Infrastructure and Development
Lists of political office-holders in Poland
Infrastructure and Development
Poland, Infrastructure and Development
Poland
Former ministries
2015 disestablishments in Poland
2013 establishments in Poland
Defunct organisations based in Poland